Nika Igorevich Chkhapeliya (Abkhazian: Ника Игор-иҧа Чҳапелиа; born 26 April 1994) is a Russian professional football player.

External links
 

1994 births
Footballers from Abkhazia
People from Ochamchira District
Living people
Russian footballers
Russia youth international footballers
Russia under-21 international footballers
FC Krasnodar players
PFC Spartak Nalchik players
FC Rostov players
Russian people of Abkhazian descent
Russian Premier League players
FC Baltika Kaliningrad players
FC Tosno players
FC Fakel Voronezh players
Association football midfielders
FC Dynamo Bryansk players
FC Krasnodar-2 players